Gurjot Singh Kaler is an Indian police officer, author, writer and singer, who authored a best selling book, New India - The Reality Reloaded in 2018. He is serving as the Superintendent of Police (SP) in Punjab Police and currently, he is in the United Kingdom, working with the Avon and Somerset Police force in the domain of Digital policing.

He has written and given voice for the songs, My Hero Farmer and Dil Se Salaam, followed by Bandeya, released by Times Music.

Early life and education 
Gurjot was born and brought up in Chandigarh, India. He has done a Master's degree in Psychology from Panjab University, Chandigarh, and also holds a Masters in Police Administration.

Cleared Punjab Civil Services Commission examination in 2012 and was appointed as Deputy Superintendent of Police (DSP). Also served in the Punjab Police's intelligence wing.

Career

Music 
In September 2016, Kaler made his music debut with a single My Hero Farmer, which depicted the harsh realities of farmers in India, was well received. The track, My hero Farmer, was released on PTC in March 2017 and was also featured at the Sikh Lens Film Festival, California.

In August 2020, his second song, Dil Se Salaam was released by Times Music under the label of Speed Records. Dil Se Salaam was a tribute to Indian soldiers, and it was written and sung by Gurjot himself while the music was given by Jaison Thind. He released his another single, titled Bandeya, under the label of Times Music and Speed Records. The track was composed by B Praak with lyrics penned by Jaani and while poignant video was directed by Arvindr Khaira. It garnered 3.1 million views on YouTube as of September 2020.

Published works 
His first book, New India-The Reality Reloaded – was launched in September 2018. In his book, New India: The Reality Reloade, Kaler has researched various concerns, conflicts and challenges facing India and put them in perspective.  The book has been reviewed by various prominent authors including Ruskin Bond, Shobhaa De, Rajdeep Sardesai of India Today and Ravish Kumar of NDTV.

Other works 
He scaled the Hurro Mountain of Machaadhar range of the Himalayas, which is situated at a height of 14,500 ft in May 2019.

In June 2020, Kaler conducted a peaceful march along with a few Indians at the Trafalgar Square in the city of Westminster, Central London. He demanded the removal of statue of Henry Havelock and Robert Clive and raised the voice against racial discrimination. A petition was also filed with the UK government.

He performed 15,000 feet skydive to salute corona warriors in September 2020.

References 

English-language writers from India
Punjabi people
21st-century Indian male writers
Indian police officers
Living people
Indian writers
21st-century Indian male singers
21st-century Indian singers
People from Punjab, India
Year of birth missing (living people)